Ryan Martin is an American Middle distance runner. Martin tried out to compete for the United States in the men's 800 m at the 2012 Summer Olympics in London, England. He is a professional runner for Asics.

Personal
Martin was born in 1989 in Orange County, California, the son of Debra and Chris Martin.

High school
Martin ran four seasons of track during his stay at Santa Margarita Catholic High School. Ryan Martin is the current school record holder at 800 meters with his time of 1:53.23 set at the CIF California State Meet where he finished in second place, and is a member of the 4x800m record setting team (7:51.51) with Kary Yergler, Mark Hirschboeck, and Jon Telles

Martin was a State Runner-up, 2-time C.I.F. SS Champion (2006, 2007), Orange County Champion, and League Champion numerous times.

During his senior season of track in his senior year, he burst onto the track scene, ranking nationally with a time of 1:53.28 in the 800 meters.

College career
Martin attended the University of California in Santa Barbara; his majors were Business Economics and Art History. During his first year of track during the 2008–2012 season, Martin ran the 800 m for the first time, and led the Gauchos in the 800.

Martin advanced to the 2009 NCAA Outdoor finals of the 800m by placing second in Heat 3. The top two times in each heat, plus the next two fastest times overall, advanced to the final. Martin's time of 1:50.23 edged him past a runner from BYU who finished at 1:50.37. On Saturday, Martin finished eighth in the 800m final with a time of 1:52.12. It was a close race, with the winner crossing the line in 1:49.48. The fifth-place runner clocked a time of 1:50.60.

Martin earned points in Big West competition. In addition, he was ranked seventh nationally in the 800 metres with a time of 1:44.77. Martin skipped his freshman year of cross country, making 2008 his first season. He was on the All-Big West First Team for finishing top fourteen in league competition.

His time of 1:44.77 at the 2012 Big West Conference Championship was good for first on the all-time University of California Santa Barbara 800 metres list. He was the NCAA all american twice in the 800 in both 2011 and 2012. The two-time All-American at UCSB was one of the youngest runners in the race and narrowly missed a berth to the London Olympic Games.

Professional
In 2012, Martin placed 4th at the USA Trials. He made it through the semifinals of the 2012 United States Olympic Trials (track and field), but failed to qualify to the Olympics by placing 4th and running a 1:44.90 in his Final.

In 2013 Martin failed to qualify for the IAAF World Championships in Moscow, Russia by placing 23rd at the USA Outdoor Track Championships, running a 1:49.72.

At the 2014 USA Outdoor Track and Field Championships Martin placed 6th in 1:52.62 in the final.

At the 2015 USA Outdoor Track and Field Championships Martin placed 5th in 1:46.04 to qualify for the NACAC Championships in Costa Rica where Ryan won the 800 meters in championship and meet records running 1:45.79.

Personal bests

References

1989 births
Living people
Track and field athletes from California
American male middle-distance runners
Pan American Games bronze medalists for the United States
Pan American Games medalists in athletics (track and field)
Athletes (track and field) at the 2015 Pan American Games
UC Santa Barbara Gauchos men's track and field athletes
Medalists at the 2015 Pan American Games